is a 2013 Japanese anime television series produced by Tatsunoko Production and Avex Pictures in cooperation with Takara Tomy Arts and Syn Sophia. The series is part of the Pretty Rhythm franchise and is its third animated series, focusing on a group of Japanese idols known as "Prism Stars" that combine song and dance with fashion and figure skating. The anime series was created as a tie-in to promote the arcade game of the same name.

Pretty Rhythm: Rainbow Live is directed by Masakazu Hishida, with character designs by Okama. The show features a story separate from its preceding seasons, Pretty Rhythm: Aurora Dream and Pretty Rhythm: Dear My Future. During the series' run, each episode ended with a live-action segment titled "Pretty Rhythm Club" hosted by the girl group Prizmmy, along with their sister trainee group Prism Mates.

After the series' run, it was succeeded by Pretty Rhythm: All Star Selection in 2014. A sequel spin-off focusing on the male characters, titled the King of Prism series, launched in theaters in 2016 beginning with the film King of Prism by Pretty Rhythm, followed by King of Prism: Pride the Hero in 2017 and King of Prism: Shiny Seven Stars in 2019.

Plot

For her work experience assignment, middle school student Naru Ayase applies for a manager position at the clothing store Prism Stone in Harajuku. There, she is introduced to Prism Shows, idol-style concerts combining song, dance, fashion, and figure skating, with heart-shaped gems called Prism Stones to accessorize. With her Pair Friend, Lovelin, she is able to perform a new type of Prism Show called a "Prism Live", where she plays an instrument in the middle of a Prism Show. Joined by her classmates, Ann Fukuhara and Ito Suzuno, Naru is hired at Prism Stone and is also asked to take care of Rinne, an amnesiac girl capable of performing four Prism Jump combinations, a feat only accomplished by the current Prism Queen, June Amou. At the same time, the girls draw attention from Bell Renjoji, Otoha Takanashi, and Wakana Morizono, top students from the elite Prism Star school Edel Rose, who challenge them to enter the Dreaming Session.

As Prism Shows are scored based on the number of Prism Jump combinations, Prism Stone loses the Dreaming Session. However, their ability to do Prism Lives interests Hijiri Himuro, the chairman of the Prism Show Association, who believes it may revitalize the public's dying interest in Prism Shows. Prism Lives are later integrated into the scoring system, and their popularity inspires June to perform in Prism Shows again. This, in turn, causes the supervisor of Edel Rose and current Prism King, Jin Norizuki, to use underhanded tactics in order to claim the title of Prism Queen for his school.

During the Winter White Session, Rinne remembers that she is a messenger from the Prism World tasked to spread the Prism Sparkle, which sustain the magic of the rinks, Pair Friends, Prism Stones, and Prism Jumps. Rinne was originally supposed to absorb June, the current Prism Messenger, but June has gone rogue from the Prism World and has been competing in Prism Shows to stay with Hijiri, therefore preventing humans from spreading the Prism Sparkle. Naru learns that in order to save the Prism Sparkle, they must claim the Prism Queen title from June during the Over the Rainbow Session and evolve their Seventh Coord. When the last of the Prism Sparkle vanishes, Naru brings it back with her determination, and Bell wins the Prism Queen Cup. After the girls send Rinne back to the Prism World, everyone moves on with their lives.

Media

Game

The original arcade game was released nationwide in Japan on April 18, 2013, beginning with session 1, titled "Prism Live Debut Edition." The game featured a new system called "Prism Live", where players can enter a bonus round that allows them to score more points with Prism Jump combinations. The session 2 update, titled "All Rare! Ki-ra-me-ki Days Edition", was launched on July 11, 2013 and added Bell, Otoha, and Wakana as playable characters. The session 3 update, titled "Chara Stone! Heartbeat Edition", launched on October 3, 2013 and added June as playable character. During the session 3 update, the game was renamed Pretty Rhythm: Rainbow Live Duo.

 was released for the Nintendo 3DS on November 28, 2013. The game features the main female cast as playable characters along with a new character, Cosmo Hojo, as well as the female cast from Pretty Rhythm: Aurora Dream and Pretty Rhythm: Dear My Future. The limited edition of the game came with an exclusive Prism Stone featuring the Miracle Fantasy Rainbow Dress, which was usable on Pretty Rhythm arcade machines. To promote the game, the January 2014 issues of Ciao and Ribon included QR codes with exclusive in-game costumes for the characters. Cosmo also appeared in episode 34 to coincide with the game's release date. Famitsu'''s editorial team gave the game an average score of 7.8/10.

An expanded version of Kirakira My Design was released for the Nintendo 3DS on January 5, 2015, under the title PriPara & Pretty Rhythm: PriPara de Tsukaeru Oshare Item 1450!, adding Hiro and PriPara character Laala Manaka as playable characters.

AnimePretty Rhythm: Rainbow Live premiered on TV Tokyo's 10 AM slot April 6, 2013 as a tie-in to the arcade game and ended on March 29, 2014. The English dub of Rainbow Live premiered on Animax Asia on June 24, 2014. The characters were designed by illustrator Okama. The plot in this series is separate from the previous seasons, Pretty Rhythm: Aurora Dream and Pretty Rhythm: Dear My Future. In addition, the plot is a continuation of the 2013 Nintendo 3DS game Pretty Rhythm: My Deco Rainbow Wedding, which focused on Rinne's backstory.

Each episode ended with a live-action segment titled "Pretty Rhythm Club", which was hosted by Prizmmy, a girl group put together by Avex Pictures, and their sister trainee group, Prism Mates. Prism Mates made an animated cameo in episode 9.

As a collaboration with Avex Pictures to celebrate TRF's 20th anniversary, Prizmmy covered several of their songs as opening themes. The opening theme songs are "Boy Meets Girl for episodes 1-13; "EZ Do Dance" for episodes 14-26; "Crazy Gonna Crazy" for episodes 27-39; and "Butterfly Effect" for episodes 40-51; all songs were performed by Prizmmy. The ending theme songs are "RainBow × RainBow" by Prism Box for episodes 1-13; "Rainbow" by Iris for episodes 14-27; "I wannabee myself (Jibun Rashiku Itai)" by Emiri Katō, Yū Serizawa, and Mikako Komatsu for episodes 27-39; and "Happy Star Restaurant" by Prism Box for episodes 40-51.

Manga

A manga adaptation illustrated by Michiyo Kikuta was serialized in Pucchigumi.

Discography

Studio albums

Merchandise

To coincide with the series, a Prism Stone shop was opened in Harajuku. In Japan, McDonald's released six exclusive Prism Stones with purchase of a Happy Meal in collaboration with the franchise beginning May 17, 2013.

Reception

Theron Martin from Anime News Network rated the first episode 2.5 out of 5, stating that the show's formulaic plot is supposed to be a "cute affair" that allows girls to "indulge in fantasies of magical clothes changes and spectacular ice dancing/singing performances." He complimented Naru for having a "likeably spunky edge" but found DJ Coo both amusing and annoying. Episode 39 scored an average household viewership of 1.9%.

Sequels

King of PrismKing of Prism is a film series focusing on the male characters of Rainbow Live, targeting an older female demographic. The 2016 film King of Prism by Pretty Rhythm grossed  in two months at the Japanese box office, where it eventually grossed  by the end of its run.

References

External links
  at Takara Tomy 
 Pretty Rhythm: Rainbow Live official anime website

Pretty Rhythm
2013 anime television series debuts
Japanese children's animated comedy television series
Japanese children's animated sports television series
Anime television series based on video games
Arcade video games
Music in anime and manga
Sports anime and manga
Syn Sophia games
Takara Tomy franchises
Tatsunoko Production
TV Tokyo original programming
Japanese idols in anime and manga
Figure skating in anime and manga
Video games developed in Japan